Sidney Iking Bateman (born March 13, 1993) is an American professional wrestler and former acrobat. Better known by the ring name Reggie, he is currently signed to WWE, where he performs on the NXT brand under the ring name Scrypts.

Bateman signed with WWE in 2020 and began appearing on the SmackDown brand under the ring name Reginald Thomas, which was soon shortened to Reginald, a French sommelier. He later dropped the sommelier gimmick and his name was changed to Reggie. While on WWE's main roster, he became a four-time WWE 24/7 Champion—his 112-day first reign was the longest reign for the now-defunct title. After taking a hiatus in mid-2022, he returned in November under a mysterious gimmick of Scrypts in WWE's developmental brand NXT.

Early life 
Sidney Iking Bateman was born one of eight siblings in Memphis, Tennessee on March 13, 1993 - but was raised in St. Louis, Missouri. He played football and basketball with circus as a side hobby, but gave those up when, at the age of 16, he joined a gang called the Crips from the 50 Hundred GST (Geraldine Street Thugs). During his junior year in high school, one of his friends was shot to death by a member of a rival gang, leading to Bateman to quit living a gang life and go back to focusing on his circus aspirations.

Professional wrestling career

WWE (2020–present)

Initial run and 24/7 Champion (2020–2022)
On January 14, 2020, Bateman signed a contract with WWE. On the December 11 episode of SmackDown, Bateman, under the ring name Reginald Thomas, soon after shortened to Reginald, debuted as the French sommelier of Carmella, where he would assist her throughout her feud with Sasha Banks. On the January 22, 2021, episode, Reginald made his in-ring debut in an intergender match, facing Banks in a losing effort. His relationship with Carmella ended on the March 5 episode when she fired him. After a short alliance with Banks, Reginald then managed the team of Nia Jax and Shayna Baszler from March to July, but the team turned on him on the July 19 episode of Raw. Later that night, he won the WWE 24/7 Championship when he pinned Akira Tozawa, marking his first title win in WWE.

On the July 30 episode of SmackDown, his ring name was shortened to Reggie. Along with shortening his name, he also dropped his French accent, stating he was not actually French and had only acted like he was because Carmella needed a sommelier and it got his foot in the door to becoming a wrestler for the company. On September 25, 2021, he became the longest reigning 24/7 Champion. On the November 8 episode of Raw, Reggie lost the 24/7 Championship to Drake Maverick, ending his reign at 112 days; however, he regained the title back from Maverick a minute later following a series of title changes. On the November 22 episode, Reggie lost the title to Cedric Alexander, ending his second reign at 12 days.

After losing the title, Reggie then helped Dana Brooke retain the title for a few months, then asked her out on Valentine's Day 2022, though she turned him down. He pinned Brooke in revenge to win the title for the third time. A week later, Reggie lost the title back to Brooke after he laid down in the ring despite kicking out of a two-count twice, as well as playing mind games. They later began dating, with Reggie once again helping her retain the title. On March 28, they got (kayfabe) engaged. On the April 18 episode of Raw, during their wedding, Reggie pinned his partner to win his fourth 24/7 title, losing to Tamina shortly after.  On May 2, Brooke lost the 24/7 title to Nikki A.S.H. during a backstage attack. Brooke soon regained the title via pinfall in a 24/7 Championship match. Brooke also requested a divorce from Reggie, after he attempted to pin her. This was his last appearance before taking a hiatus.

Move to NXT (2022–present)
In late October, mysterious vignettes began airing on NXT that were done by a person under the alias Scrypts, a seemingly rebellious character who claimed to have unparalleled skills and would bring down NXT. More vignettes aired over the next few weeks and on the November 22 episode of NXT, Reggie debuted for the brand as the mysterious Scrypts, officially changing his ring name and gimmick. In December, Scrypts had a brief feud with Ikemen Jiro after taking his jacket, beating him on the December 27 episode of NXT and giving back his jacket afterwards. On the January 27, 2023 episode of NXT Level Up, Scrypts defeated Oro Mensah.

Personal life 
Bateman is a father of two. He used to perform in the circus, notably for Cirque du Soleil, training at Circus Harmony for seven years and in Montreal for another three.

Championships and accomplishments 
Pro Wrestling Illustrated
Ranked No. 490 of the 500 best singles wrestlers in the PWI 500 in 2022
 WWE
 WWE 24/7 Championship (4 times)

References

External links 
 
 
 
 

1993 births
African-American male professional wrestlers
American acrobatic gymnasts
American circus performers
American male professional wrestlers
Cirque du Soleil performers
Living people
Male acrobatic gymnasts
Sportspeople from St. Louis
WWE 24/7 Champions
21st-century African-American sportspeople
21st-century professional wrestlers